John Foreman (July 26, 1925 – November 20, 1992) was an American film producer.

Biography

Early life
John Christian Foreman was born on July 26, 1925, in Idaho Falls, Idaho.

Career
In the late 1960s, he and actor Paul Newman founded Newman-Foreman productions. He went on to produce  Winning (1969) and  Butch Cassidy and the Sundance Kid (1969). He later produced four films in collaboration with director John Huston, The Life and Times of Judge Roy Bean  (1972), The Mackintosh Man (1973), The Man Who Would Be King (1975), and Prizzi's Honor (1985). His other film credits as producer include, The Effect of Gamma Rays on Man-in-the-Moon Marigolds (1972) and They Might Be Giants (1971)

He was nominated twice for the Academy Award Best Picture for his films Butch Cassidy and the Sundance Kid and Prizzi's Honor.

Forman was married to actress and singer Linda Lawson. Amanda Foreman and Julie Foreman, both actresses, are their daughters.

Death
He died on November 19, 1992, in Beverly Hills, California.

Filmography
He was producer for all films unless otherwise noted.

Film

References

External links
 
 

1925 births
1992 deaths
People from Idaho Falls, Idaho
People from Beverly Hills, California
Film producers from California
Golden Globe Award-winning producers
Burials at Hollywood Forever Cemetery
20th-century American businesspeople